O1 or O-1 may refer to:

Aircraft 
O-1 Bird Dog, an observation aircraft manufactured by Cessna
O-1 Curtiss Falcon, an observation aircraft manufactured by the Curtiss Aircraft Company
O-1 Airship, an Italian manufactured semi-rigid airship operated by the US Navy

Music 
O1 (Hiroyuki Sawano album), 2015
O1 (Son of Dave album), 2000

Military 
O-1 or fenrik, a second lieutenant rank in Norway
 The pay grade for ensign and second lieutenant ranks in the U.S. uniformed services
USS O-1 (SS-62), lead ship of the United States O class submarines
HNLMS O 1, a 1905 Royal Netherlands Navy O class submarine

Science and technology
 O1 type star, a subclass of O-type star
 O-1 tool steel, a type of oil-hardening tool steel
 Haplogroup O1 (Y-DNA), a Y-DNA haplogroup
 O1: an EEG electrode site according to the 10–20 system
 O(1), time complexity expressed using Big O notation

Other 
 O-1 visa, a variety of the U.S. O visa, allowing for temporary immigration for work purposes for individuals of extraordinary ability or achievement in certain areas
 Otoyol 1, a motorway in Turkey
 Ö1, an Austrian radio station
 O1 Communications, Inc., a California telecommunications company
Orchestra ONE (O1), an experimental youth orchestra based in Maidstone, United Kingdom
 GNR Class O1, a class of British 2-8-0 steam locomotive designed by Nigel Gresley (later redesignated Class O3)
 LNER Thompson Class O1, a class of British 2-8-0 steam locomotive designed by Edward Thompson and rebuilt from Class O4

See also
 01 (disambiguation)
 1O (disambiguation)